Bodson may refer to:-
Herman Bodson - Belgian resistance member and mineralogist
Omer Bodson - Belgian army officer
Philippe Bodson - Belgian businessman and former senator
Victor Bodson - Justice minister of Luxembourg
The Victor Bodson Bridge named after him